This article compares the syntax for defining and instantiating an algebraic data type (ADT), sometimes also referred to as a tagged union, in various programming languages.

Examples of algebraic data types

Ceylon 

In Ceylon, an ADT may be defined with:

abstract class Tree()
    of empty | Node {}

object empty
    extends Tree() {}

final class Node(shared Integer val, shared Tree left, shared Tree right)
    extends Tree() {}

And instantiated as:

value myTree = Node(42, Node(0, empty, empty), empty);

Clean 

In Clean, an ADT may be defined with:

:: Tree
  = Empty
  | Node Int Tree Tree

And instantiated as:

myTree = Node 42 (Node 0 Empty Empty) Empty

Coq 

In Coq, an ADT may be defined with:

Inductive tree : Type :=
| empty : tree
| node : nat -> tree -> tree -> tree.

And instantiated as:

Definition my_tree := node 42 (node 0 empty empty) empty.

C++ 

In C++, an ADT may be defined with:

struct Empty final {};

struct Node final {
    int value;
    std::unique_ptr<std::variant<Empty, Node>> left;
    std::unique_ptr<std::variant<Empty, Node>> right;
};

using Tree = std::variant<Empty, Node>;

And instantiated as:

Tree myTree { Node{
    42,
    std::make_unique<Tree>(Node{
        0,
        std::make_unique<Tree>(),
        std::make_unique<Tree>()
    }),
    std::make_unique<Tree>()
} };

Elm 

In Elm, an ADT may be defined with:

type Tree
  = Empty
  | Node Int Tree Tree

And instantiated as:

myTree = Node 42 (Node 0 Empty Empty) Empty

F# 

In F#, an ADT may be defined with:

type Tree =
    | Empty
    | Node of int * Tree * Tree

And instantiated as:

let myTree = Node(42, Node(0, Empty, Empty), Empty)

F* 

In F*, an ADT may be defined with:

type tree =
  | Empty : tree
  | Node : value:nat -> left:tree -> right:tree -> tree

And instantiated as:

let my_tree = Node 42 (Node 0 Empty Empty) Empty

Free Pascal 

In Free Pascal, an ADT may be defined with:

type
  TTreeKind = (tkEmpty, tkNode);

  PTree = ^TTree;

  TTree = record
    case FKind: TTreeKind of
      tkEmpty:;
      tkNode: (
        FValue: Integer;
        FLeft, FRight: PTree;
      );
  end;

And instantiated as:

var
  MyTree: PTree;

begin
  new(MyTree);
  MyTree^.FKind := tkNode;
  MyTree^.FValue := 42;
  new(MyTree^.FLeft);
  MyTree^.FLeft^.FKind := tkNode;
  MyTree^.FLeft^.FValue := 0;
  new(MyTree^.FLeft^.FLeft);
  MyTree^.FLeft^.FLeft^.FKind := tkEmpty;
  new(MyTree^.FLeft^.FRight);
  MyTree^.FLeft^.FRight^.FKind := tkEmpty;
  new(MyTree^.FRight);
  MyTree^.FRight^.FKind := tkEmpty;
end.

Haskell 

In Haskell, an ADT may be defined with:

data Tree
    = Empty
    | Node Int Tree Tree

And instantiated as:

myTree = Node 42 (Node 0 Empty Empty) Empty

Haxe 

In Haxe, an ADT may be defined with:

enum Tree {
	Empty;
	Node(value:Int, left:Tree, right:Tree);
}

And instantiated as:

var myTree = Node(42, Node(0, Empty, Empty), Empty);

Hope 

In Hope, an ADT may be defined with:

data tree == empty
          ++ node (num # tree # tree);

And instantiated as:

dec mytree : tree;
--- mytree <= node (42, node (0, empty, empty), empty);

Idris 

In Idris, an ADT may be defined with:

data Tree
    = Empty
    | Node Nat Tree Tree

And instantiated as:

myTree : Tree
myTree = Node 42 (Node 0 Empty Empty) Empty

Java 

In Java, an ADT may be defined with:

sealed interface Tree {
    record Empty() implements Tree {}
    record Node(int value, Tree left, Tree right) implements Tree {}
}

And instantiated as:

var myTree = new Tree.Node(
    42,
    new Tree.Node(0, new Tree.Empty(), new Tree.Empty()),
    new Tree.Empty()
);

Julia 

In Julia, an ADT may be defined with:

struct Empty
end

struct Node
    value::Int
    left::Union{Empty, Node}
    right::Union{Empty, Node}
end

const Tree = Union{Empty, Node}

And instantiated as:

mytree = Node(42, Node(0, Empty(), Empty()), Empty())

Kotlin 

In Kotlin, an ADT may be defined with:

sealed class Tree {
    object Empty : Tree()
    data class Node(val value: Int, val left: Tree, val right: Tree) : Tree()
}

And instantiated as:

val myTree = Tree.Node(
    42,
    Tree.Node(0, Tree.Empty, Tree.Empty),
    Tree.Empty,
)

Limbo 

In Limbo, an ADT may be defined with:

Tree: adt {
	pick {
	Empty =>
	Node =>
		value: int;
		left: ref Tree;
		right: ref Tree;
	}
};

And instantiated as:

myTree := ref Tree.Node(
	42,
	ref Tree.Node(0, ref Tree.Empty(), ref Tree.Empty()),
	ref Tree.Empty()
);

Mercury 

In Mercury, an ADT may be defined with:

:- type tree
    --->    empty
    ;       node(int, tree, tree).

And instantiated as:

:- func my_tree = tree.
my_tree = node(42, node(0, empty, empty), empty).

Miranda 

In Miranda, an ADT may be defined with:

tree ::=
    Empty
    | Node num tree tree

And instantiated as:

my_tree = Node 42 (Node 0 Empty Empty) Empty

Nemerle 

In Nemerle, an ADT may be defined with:

variant Tree
{
    | Empty
    | Node {
        value: int;
        left: Tree;
        right: Tree;
    }
}

And instantiated as:

def myTree = Tree.Node(
    42,
    Tree.Node(0, Tree.Empty(), Tree.Empty()),
    Tree.Empty(),
);

Nim 

In Nim, an ADT may be defined with:

type
  TreeKind = enum
    tkEmpty
    tkNode

  Tree = ref TreeObj

  TreeObj = object
    case kind: TreeKind
    of tkEmpty:
      discard
    of tkNode:
      value: int
      left, right: Tree

And instantiated as:

let myTree = Tree(kind: tkNode, value: 42,
                  left: Tree(kind: tkNode, value: 0,
                             left: Tree(kind: tkEmpty),
                             right: Tree(kind: tkEmpty)),
                  right: Tree(kind: tkEmpty))

OCaml 

In OCaml, an ADT may be defined with:

type tree =
  | Empty
  | Node of int * tree * tree

And instantiated as:

let my_tree = Node (42, Node (0, Empty, Empty), Empty)

Opa 

In Opa, an ADT may be defined with:

type tree =
  { empty } or
  { node, int value, tree left, tree right }

And instantiated as:

my_tree = {
  node,
  value: 42,
  left: {
    node,
    value: 0,
    left: { empty },
    right: { empty }
  },
  right: { empty }
}

OpenCog 

In OpenCog, an ADT may be defined with:

PureScript 

In PureScript, an ADT may be defined with:

data Tree
  = Empty
  | Node Int Tree Tree

And instantiated as:

myTree = Node 42 (Node 0 Empty Empty) Empty

Racket 

In Typed Racket, an ADT may be defined with:

(struct Empty)
(struct Node ([value : Integer] [left : Tree] [right : Tree]))
(define-type Tree (U Empty Node))

And instantiated as:

(define my-tree (Node 42 (Node 0 (Empty) (Empty)) (Empty)))

Reason

Reason 
In Reason, an ADT may be defined with:

type Tree =
  | Empty
  | Node(int, Tree, Tree);

And instantiated as:

let myTree = Node(42, Node(0, Empty, Empty), Empty);

ReScript 
In ReScript, an ADT may be defined with:

type rec Tree =
  | Empty
  | Node(int, Tree, Tree)

And instantiated as:

let myTree = Node(42, Node(0, Empty, Empty), Empty)

Rust 

In Rust, an ADT may be defined with:

enum Tree {
    Empty,
    Node(i32, Box<Tree>, Box<Tree>),
}

And instantiated as:

let my_tree = Tree::Node(
    42,
    Box::new(Tree::Node(0, Box::new(Tree::Empty), Box::new(Tree::Empty)),
    Box::new(Tree::Empty),
);

Scala

Scala 2 
In Scala 2, an ADT may be defined with:

sealed abstract class Tree extends Product with Serializable

object Tree {
  final case object Empty extends Tree
  final case class Node(value: Int, left: Tree, right: Tree)
      extends Tree
}

And instantiated as:

val myTree = Tree.Node(
  42,
  Tree.Node(0, Tree.Empty, Tree.Empty),
  Tree.Empty
)

Scala 3 
In Scala 3, an ADT may be defined with:

enum Tree:
  case Empty
  case Node(value: Int, left: Tree, right: Tree)

And instantiated as:

val myTree = Tree.Node(
  42,
  Tree.Node(0, Tree.Empty, Tree.Empty),
  Tree.Empty
)

Standard ML 

In Standard ML, an ADT may be defined with:

datatype tree =
    EMPTY
  | NODE of int * tree * tree

And instantiated as:

val myTree = NODE (42, NODE (0, EMPTY, EMPTY), EMPTY)

Swift 

In Swift, an ADT may be defined with:

enum Tree {
    case empty
    indirect case node(Int, Tree, Tree)
}

And instantiated as:

let myTree: Tree = .node(42, .node(0, .empty, .empty), .empty)

TypeScript 

In TypeScript, an ADT may be defined with:

type Tree =
  | { kind: "empty" }
  | { kind: "node"; value: number; left: Tree; right: Tree };

And instantiated as:

const myTree: Tree = {
  kind: "node",
  value: 42,
  left: {
    kind: "node",
    value: 0,
    left: { kind: "empty" },
    right: { kind: "empty" },
  },
  right: { kind: "empty" },
};

Visual Prolog 

In Visual Prolog, an ADT may be defined with:

domains
    tree = empty; node(integer, tree, tree).

And instantiated as:

constants
    my_tree : tree = node(42, node(0, empty, empty), empty).

References 

Algebraic data type